Folliott Sandford Pierpoint (7 October 1835 – 1917) was a hymnodist and poet.

Born at Spa Villa, Bath, England, he was educated at Queens' College, Cambridge. Pierpoint was a classics schoolmaster and a devout Tractarian. He taught at Somersetshire College, spending most of his life in Bath and the south-west.

He published The Chalice of Nature and Other Poems, republished, 1878, as Songs of Love, The Chalice of Nature and Lyra Jesu. He also contributed hymns to the Churchman's Companion, The Lyra Eucharistica, etc.

His most famous hymn is For the Beauty of the Earth which he wrote in 1864, aged 29.

Pierpoint died in 1917, at the age of 82.

References

External links
 

English hymnwriters
People from Bath, Somerset
1835 births
Alumni of Queens' College, Cambridge
1917 deaths
Christian hymnwriters
19th-century English musicians
Tractarians
English Anglo-Catholics
Anglican poets
Anglo-Catholic writers